Vladimir Borisovich Tukmakov (born March 5, 1946, in Odessa) is a Ukrainian chess grandmaster. He gained the Grandmaster title in 1972.

Career
His career first blossomed when he helped and then led the USSR to consecutive wins of the World Student Team Championship from 1966 to 1972, winning nine gold medals along the way.

In the 1970s and 1980s he progressed to the senior Soviet Russian team and was again on the multiple gold medal winning trail. In his only Olympiad appearance in 1984 he took team gold and in 1973, 1983 and 1989 he played in the European Team Chess Championship, where his collective haul was an amazing 5 (three team and two individual) gold medals.

In international tournaments, his best results include second place (after Fischer) at Buenos Aires 1970, 2nd (after Karpov) at Madrid 1973, 1st= (with Jansa and Ivkov) at IBM Amsterdam tournament 1974, 1st at Decin 1977, 1st= (with Sax) at Las Palmas 1978, 1st at Vilnius 1978 (ahead of Tigran Petrosian) and 1st at Malta 1980. At Yerevan 1982, he was 2nd (after Yusupov), at Tilburg 1984, 2nd= (after Miles). Tukmakov also won the strong Lugano Open in 1985 and the 30th Reggio Emilia tournament 1987/88; at Amsterdam OHRA-B (Open) 1990, shared first place with Judit Polgár. He won the Canadian Open Chess Championship in 1989 and 1994.

At the Gijon (active) tournament of 1988, he showed he was a fine player of rapid chess too, finishing joint first with Anatoly Karpov.

Of his many attempts to become Soviet champion he came very close on three occasions; at Riga 1970, Baku 1972 and at Moscow 1983, where he finished behind Korchnoi, Tal and Karpov respectively. He was however the national champion of Ukraine in 1970.

At the momentous London 1984 USSR vs Rest of the World clash, he made a surprising, but important contribution. Starting as a lowly reserve for the USSR team, he was twice asked to substitute for Smyslov on board 4 and then once for Polugaevsky on board 3. The outcome was that he delivered the team a useful net plus score against Ljubojević (one win and one draw) and Korchnoi (draw).

Much less active as a player nowadays, Tukmakov nevertheless retains a competitive Elo rating (2551 in October 2007). Competing at the very strong Odessa rapid tournament of 2007, he got off to a flying start, drawing with Korchnoi and defeating the highly rated Smirin and Bacrot. Sadly, tiredness then took over and he lost the remainder of his games.

He was non-playing captain with the victorious Ukraine team at the 36th Chess Olympiad in Calvià (2004). In the same year he was awarded the title of FIDE Senior Trainer.

Anish Giri, a Dutch grandmaster, has started working with Tukmakov in 2014.

Books

References

Olimpbase - Olympiads and other Team event information
Chessbase article and confirmation of Tukmakov's birthday (wrongly given as 15/3/46 in most sources)

External links

1946 births
Living people
Ukrainian Jews
Russian Jews
Chess grandmasters
Chess Olympiad competitors
Chess coaches
National team coaches
Ukrainian chess players
Soviet chess players
Russian chess players
Jewish chess players
Sportspeople from Odesa